The Latin word refrigerium literally means "refreshment", and is the origin of the English noun refrigerator (Webster, 1913).  In ancient Rome, the word referred specifically to a commemorative meal for the dead consumed in a graveyard.  

These meals were held on the day of burial, then again on the ninth day after the funeral, and annually thereafter.  Early Christians continued the refrigerium ritual, by taking food to gravesites and catacombs in honor of Christian martyrs, as well as relatives.

The early Christian theologian Tertullian used the term refrigerium interim to describe a happy state in which the souls of the blessed are refreshed while they await the Last Judgment and their definitive entry into heaven.  

Later Christian writers referred to a similar, interim state of grace as the "Bosom of Abraham" (a term taken from Luke 16:22, 23).  Tertullian's notions of refrigerium were part of a debate on whether the souls of the dead had to await the End of Times and the Last Judgment before their entrance into either heaven or hell, or whether, on the other hand, each soul was assigned its place in the eternal afterlife immediately after death (see particular judgment).

In C.S. Lewis's The Great Divorce, the concept is described as "the damned have holidays". In the book, the damned take an excursion to heaven (for refreshment) where they are invited to stay.

References

 La Piana, George, The Tombs of Peter and Paul Ad Catacumbas, The Harvard Theological Review, Vol. 14, No. 1 (Jan., 1921), 53.  
 Lietzmann, Hans, The Tomb of the Apostles Ad Catacumbas, The Harvard Theological Review, Vol. 16, No. 2 (Apr., 1923), 147.   
 Webster, Noah, Webster's Revised Unabridged Dictionary of the English Language, Springfield, Mass., G. & C. Merriam Company, 1913.
 Jacques Le Goff, The Birth of Purgatory, (Chicago: The University of Chicago Press, 1986).  

Ceremonial food and drink
Funeral food and drink